Lucie Pépin (born September 7, 1936) is a Canadian nurse and former politician. Pépin served in both the House of Commons and Senate.

Career
A Registered Nurse by profession, in the 1960s, Pépin served as head nurse in the gynecology department and then at the family planning clinic of Notre-Dame Hospital in Montreal, and was cross-appointed to the Université de Montréal's faculty of medicine. In the 1970s, she was an administrator at the Canadian Committee for Fertility Research in Montreal, and a lecturer at the Université de Montréal. From 1979 until 1984, Pépin was vice-president and then president of the Canadian Advisory Council on the Status of Women.

Politics
Pépin entered the House of Commons of Canada in the 1984 election when she became the Liberal Member of Parliament for Outremont, Quebec succeeding Marc Lalonde. She was defeated in the 1988 election, during which abortion was a key issue.  Some have suggested that she lost the ultra-conservative Hasidic vote, and thus the seat, because of her pro choice stance.

From 1993 to 1997, she was a commissioner on the national parole board. In 1997, she was appointed to the Senate of Canada on the recommendation of Prime Minister Jean Chrétien, and served as Speaker pro tempore of the Upper House from 2002 to 2004.  Until her retirement, she was a member of the Senate Standing Committee on Social Affairs, Science and Technology.

On September 7, 2011, Pépin retired from the Senate upon reaching the mandatory retirement age of 75.

Notes and references

External links
  (Archived)
 

1936 births
Canadian senators from Quebec
Liberal Party of Canada MPs
Liberal Party of Canada senators
Living people
Members of the House of Commons of Canada from Quebec
Women members of the House of Commons of Canada
Women members of the Senate of Canada
Knights of the National Order of Quebec
Women in Quebec politics
21st-century Canadian politicians
21st-century Canadian women politicians